Alexander Nikolaevich Titov (born 14 April 1975) is a retired Russian professional ice hockey defenceman.

External links

1975 births
Amur Khabarovsk players
Atlant Moscow Oblast players
Avangard Omsk players
Avtomobilist Yekaterinburg players
Barys Nur-Sultan players
HC CSKA Moscow players
HC Lada Togliatti players
HC Neftekhimik Nizhnekamsk players
Living people
Sportspeople from Lipetsk
Russian ice hockey defencemen
Russian Penguins players
SKA Saint Petersburg players